Jack Wallace (born June 24, 1998, in Suffern, New York) is an American ice sled hockey player. He was a member of the gold medal-winning US team at the 2018 and 2022 Winter Paralympics.

Career
He was honored in his hometown after returning from the Paralympics. His disability stems from an amputation of his right leg above the knee after a water skiing accident in youth.

A resident of Nashville, TN., Wallace grew up in Franklin Lakes, NJ graduated from Indian Hills High School in 2016.

Jack graduated from The College Of New Jersey (TCNJ) with a BS in Biomedical Engineering in 2020

Jack is currently rostered on the US National Sled Hockey team.

References

External links 
 
 

1998 births
Living people
American amputees
American sledge hockey players
Paralympic sledge hockey players of the United States
Paralympic gold medalists for the United States
Para ice hockey players at the 2018 Winter Paralympics
Medalists at the 2018 Winter Paralympics
Medalists at the 2022 Winter Paralympics
Ice hockey players from New Jersey
People from Franklin Lakes, New Jersey
People from Ridgewood, New Jersey
Paralympic medalists in sledge hockey